Ghost Hunters International (abbreviated as GHI) is a spin-off series of Ghost Hunters that aired on Syfy (formerly Sci-Fi). The series premiered on January 9, 2008 and ended on April 4, 2012. Like its parent series, GHI is a reality series that followed a team of paranormal investigators; whereas, the original series primarily covers only locations within the United States, the GHI team traveled around the world and documented some of the world's most legendary haunted locations.

Series overview

Episodes

Season 1 (2008–09)

Season 2 (2009–11)

Season 3 (2011–12)

See also 

Ghost Hunters International home media releases

References

External links
 
 
 Ghost Hunters International at tv.msn.com
 

Episodes
Lists of American non-fiction television series episodes